The Wisden Cricketers of the Year are cricketers selected for the honour by the annual publication Wisden Cricketers' Almanack, based primarily on their "influence on the previous English season". The award began in 1889 with the naming of "Six Great Bowlers of the Year", and continued with the naming of "Nine Great Batsmen of the Year" in 1890 and "6 Great Wicket-Keepers" in 1891.

Since 1897, with a few notable exceptions, the annual award has recognised five players of the year.  No players were named in 1916 or 1917, as the First World War prevented any first-class cricket being played in England, while in 1918 and 1919 the recipients were five schoolboy cricketers. From 1941 to 1946, the Second World War caused the same issue and no players were named. Three players have been sole recipients:  W. G. Grace (1896), Plum Warner (1921) and Jack Hobbs (1926).  The latter two selections are the only exceptions to the rule that a player may receive the award only once.  Hobbs was first recognised in 1909, but was selected a second time in 1926 to honour his breaking W. G. Grace's record of 126 first-class hundreds; Warner was first honoured in 1904, but received a second award in 1921 for his last season in first-class cricket, when he led Middlesex to a County Championship win. John Wisden, cricketer and eponymous founder of the almanack, was featured in a special commemorative section in the Jubilee edition of the publication in 1913, 29 years posthumously.

From 2000 to 2003 the award was made based on players' impact on cricket worldwide rather than just the preceding season in England, but the decision was reversed in 2004 with the introduction of a separate Wisden Leading Cricketer in the World award.

The oldest surviving recipient of the award is Neil Harvey (1954), which he became in February 2022 with the death of Sonny Ramadhin.  The longest that a recipient has lived after receiving the award is 77 years by Harry Calder (1918), who died in 1995.  Calder, however, uniquely for a male recipient, played no first-class cricket.  Among first-class players, the longest-lived after receipt of the award is 74 years by Wilfred Rhodes (1899). Eight women have been chosen: Claire Taylor (2009), Charlotte Edwards (2014), Heather Knight (2018), Natalie Sciver (2018), Anya Shrubsole (2018), Tammy Beaumont (2019), Ellyse Perry (2020) and Dane van Niekerk (2022).



List of Cricketers of the Year

See also
 Wisden Leading Cricketer in the World
 Wisden Leading Woman Cricketer in the World
 Six Giants of the Wisden Century
 Wisden Australia's Cricketer of the Year
 Wisden Cricketers of the Century
 ICC Awards

References
General

Specific

External links
Wisden online archive (includes copies of the Wisden Cricketers' Almanack essays on each Cricketer of the Year)
Full List on Cricinfo

 
Cricket awards and rankings
British sports trophies and awards
Wisden